The 2021 COSAFA Women's Championship was 9th edition of the COSAFA Women's Championship, a women's international football tournament for national teams organised by COSAFA, teams from Southern Africa. It will take place from 28 September to 9 October 2021 in the Nelson Mandela Bay Metropolitan Municipality, South Africa.

South Africa are the defending champion by having defeated Botswana 1–2 goals on 14 November 2020. They were beaten by Malawi in the semi finals 3–2.

Participants
Nine of the fourteen COSAFA member took take part in the competition. South Sudan and Tanzania from the CECAFA region entered as guests. Comoros withdrew and were replaced by guests Uganda from the CECAFA region. The draw was held on 12 August 2021.

 (guest)
 (guest)
 (guest)

Did not enter

Squads

Venue
Matches will be held at the Nelson Mandela Bay Stadium and Wolfson Stadium in Port Elizabeth, South Africa.

Officials

Referees
 Chipo Mayimbo Mercy
 Mercy Kayria
 Antsino Twanyanyukwa
 Assistant Referees
 Hapinnes Mbandambanda
 Claris Simango
 Faith Mloyi
 Maneo Tau 
 Olinda Couana
 Mercy Zulu

Group stage
The group stage is composed of three groups of four teams each. Group winners and the best runner-up amongst all groups advance to the semi-finals.

All times are South African Standard Time (UTC+2).

Group A

Group B

Group C

Ranking of runner-up teams

Knockout stage

Bracket
In the knockout stage, extra-time and a penalty shoot-out will be used to decide the winner if necessary.

Semi-finals

Third place match

Final

Overall ranking

Statistics

Goalscorers

Awards 
The following awards were given at the conclusion of the tournament.

References

External links
Official website

2020
2021 in African football
2020–21 in South African soccer
2021 in South African women's sport
2020 in women's association football
International association football competitions hosted by South Africa
September 2021 sports events in Africa